Heinrich Gustav Neuhaus (Genrikh Gustavovič Nejgauz, 10 October 1964) was a Russian-born pianist and teacher. Part of a musical dynasty, he grew up in a Polish-speaking household. He taught at the Moscow Conservatory from 1922 to 1964. He was made a People's Artist of the RSFSR in 1956. His piano textbook The Art of Piano Playing (1958) is regarded as one of the most authoritative and widely used approaches to the subject.

Life and career
Neuhaus was born in Elizavetgrad, which was in the Russian Empire, known since 2016 as, Kropyvnytskyi, in present-day Ukraine. Although both his parents were piano teachers, he was largely self-taught. A major influence on his early artistic development came from Karol Szymanowski, his neighbour and cousin through his mother, Olga, "Marta" née Blumenfeld. Szymanowski himself was tutored by Heinrich's father, Gustav Neuhaus. Another strong influence was his uncle, Felix Blumenfeld on the latter's visits to his sister's home in the locality. He also received lessons from Aleksander Michałowski. At the age of eleven, Neuhaus made his first public appearance, performing an impromptu and some waltzes by Frédéric Chopin. In 1902 he gave a recital in Elisavetgrad with the 11-year-old Mischa Elman and in 1904 gave concerts in Dortmund, Bonn, Cologne and Berlin. Subsequently, he studied with Leopold Godowsky in Berlin and from 1909 until the outbreak of World War I took part in his master classes at the Vienna Academy of Music.

In 1912, Neuhaus attended a concert in Berlin in which Arthur Rubinstein premiered Szymanowski's Piano Sonata No. 2, and left a suicide note saying that the concert had made clear to him that he would never be successful as a composer or a pianist and that he could not go on living, and was going to Florence in Italy to die. Szymanowski and Rubinstein hastily followed Neuhaus to Florence and tracked him down to a hospital, where he was safe and recovering after cutting his wrist in a hotel.

In 1914 Neuhaus started teaching in Elizavetgrad and later Tbilisi and Kiev where he befriended Vladimir Horowitz. After a temporary paralysis, Neuhaus was forced to halt his concert career and turned to teaching instead. In 1922 he began teaching at the Moscow Conservatory where he helped to create the famous Moscow Central Music School for gifted children in 1932. In addition, he also served as director of the Moscow Conservatory between 1934 and 1937. When Nazi Germany approached Moscow in 1941, he was imprisoned on suspicion of being a German spy, but released eight months later under pressure from Dmitri Shostakovich, Emil Gilels and others.  His pupils there included Sviatoslav Richter, Emil Gilels, Yakov Zak, Lev Naumov, Margarita Fyodorova, Vera Gornostayeva, Eliso Virsaladze, Radu Lupu, Victor Eresko, Anatoly Vedernikov, Tikhon Khrennikov, Galina Melikhova, Yevgeny Malinin, Alexander Edelmann, Tamara Guseva, Ryszard Bakst, Teodor Gutman, Alexander Slobodyanik, Nathan Perelman, Leonid Brumberg, Igor Zhukov, Oleg Boshniakovich, Anton Ginsburg, Valery Kastelsky, Gérard Frémy, Zdeněk Hnát, Alexei Lubimov, Aleksey Nasedkin, Vladimir Krainev, Berta Maranz, Evgeny Mogilevsky, Amalya Baiburtyan, Valentina Kameníková, Victor Derevianko, Vera Razumovskaya, Nina Svetlanova, Boris Petrushansky and Yuri Krechkovsky.

Neuhaus died in Moscow on 10 October 1964.

Legacy
Neuhaus was renowned for the poetic magnetism of his playing and for his artistic refinement. He was a lifelong friend of Boris Pasternak, and Osip Mandelstam expressed his admiration for Neuhaus's playing in a poem. Stanislav Neuhaus, Heinrich's son by his first wife Zinaida, who later married Pasternak in 1931, was also a noted pianist. Stanislav Bunin is his grandson.

References

Further reading

External links

 Neuhaus.it
 Ninasvetlanova.com

1888 births
1964 deaths
Soviet classical pianists
20th-century classical pianists
Soviet music educators
Piano pedagogues
Musicians from Kropyvnytskyi
People from the Russian Empire of Polish descent
People from the Russian Empire of German descent
Soviet people of Polish descent
Soviet people of German descent
People's Artists of the RSFSR
Soviet people of Jewish descent
Soviet classical musicians